Robert Barisford Brown (born February 5, 1969) is an American singer, songwriter and dancer. Brown, alongside frequent collaborator Teddy Riley, is noted as one of the pioneers of new jack swing: a fusion of hip hop and R&B. Brown started his career in the R&B and pop group New Edition, from its inception in 1978 until his exit from the group in December 1985.

Once he started a solo career, Brown enjoyed commercial and critical success with his second album Don't Be Cruel (1988) which spawned five Billboard Hot 100 top 10 singles, including the number one hit "My Prerogative", and the Grammy Award-winning "Every Little Step". In 1989, Brown contributed two songs to the soundtrack of Ghostbusters II. Brown's next album Bobby (1992) spawned several singles including "Humpin' Around", "Get Away", and "Good Enough". However, despite going 3× Platinum, sales of Bobby did not reach the level of its predecessor. Brown has sold over 50 million copies worldwide. Also in 1992, Brown married the superstar singer Whitney Houston, with whom he later had a daughter named Bobbi Kristina Brown. The couple's drug issues and domestic disputes made them tabloid fodder.

Brown also appeared in the films A Thin Line Between Love and Hate and Two Can Play That Game. He returned to New Edition for a reunion album and tour from 1996 to 1997, and returned with all six members for another stint in 2005. Brown and Houston starred in the 2005 reality show Being Bobby Brown. Houston, who filed for divorce two years later in 2007, died in 2012, followed by their daughter in 2015.

Early life 
Brown was born in Boston, Massachusetts, as one of eight children. His mother Carole Elizabeth (born Williams) was a substitute teacher, and his father Herbert James Brown was a construction worker. Brown grew up in Roxbury's Orchard Park Projects. Brown's first taste of being onstage occurred when he was three and one of his childhood idols, James Brown, performed in Boston. This performance sparked a dream of becoming a singer. Brown joined the church choir, where he recognized and developed his singing abilities. Brown's musical influences also include Rick James, Michael Jackson, Marvin Gaye and Prince.

Music career

New Edition 

New Edition was founded in 1981 by 12-year-old Brown and childhood friends Michael Bivins and Ricky Bell. Ralph Tresvant joined the group at the suggestion of Bell who sang with Tresvant as a duo. Brown was also familiar with Tresvant since they were children. In 1982, they became a quintet when their manager Brooke Payne insisted on bringing in his nephew Ronnie DeVoe, to complete the group. After performing in several talent shows in the Boston area in 1979, they signed a deal with fellow Bostonian Arthur Baker's Streetwise Records, who released their debut album Candy Girl. The title track, on which Brown sang co-lead alongside Bell and Tresvant, was a top-20 hit on Billboard's R&B Singles Chart in 1983. Brown's first full lead vocal performance was on the New Edition ballad "Jealous Girl", which was a minor hit when it also charted in 1983. The group became pop sensations with their self-titled second release. The album included the crossover hits "Cool It Now" and "Mr. Telephone Man", which Brown also co-led.

Despite the group's success, however, Brown felt the group was never rightfully paid the money they felt they had earned, later saying, "The most I saw from all the tours and all of the records we sold was $500 and a VCR." Brown also allegedly grew jealous of the attention given to fellow New Edition member Ralph Tresvant, and during some of their tour performances would often step out of his position and perform out of turn, singing and performing seductively, which caused concern within the group's management team. Brown was featured on two more New Edition albums before leaving the group in early 1986. Brown later said he felt that the group's management treated them "like little slaves by people who were only interested in money and power, and not in the welfare of New Edition". Some controversy arose over the way Brown was removed from the group. Some say Brown asked to be let out of New Edition, but a VH-1 Behind the Music documentary on the group claimed Brown was voted out by the group via their management team, with the members—most prominently Tresvant—against the decision.

Solo career 
Following his exit from New Edition, Brown signed a contract with his former group's label, MCA (which had earlier promised Brown a solo deal if he had decided to leave New Edition), and also signed with manager Steven Machat, who had also worked with New Edition. The label released his debut album King of Stage in 1986. Brown had a number-one R&B hit with the ballad "Girlfriend", but the album otherwise failed to perform well.

Brown laid low for more than a year while working on his follow-up album. With the help of Machat and MCA representative Louil Silas, Brown began working with some of the top R&B producers and songwriters of the time, including Babyface, Antonio "L.A." Reid and Teddy Riley. The producers helped to compose what became Brown's most successful solo album of his career, Don't Be Cruel. Released in 1988, the album launched five top-ten hits on the Billboard Hot 100, including the number-one single, the self-penned "My Prerogative", which became, along with "Every Little Step" and the title track, signature hits for the performer. After topping both the pop and R&B charts, album sales would eventually reach twelve million copies worldwide, making it the bestselling album of 1989. In February 1990, he won the Grammy Award for Best Male R&B Vocal Performance for the album's fourth single "Every Little Step". Don't Be Cruel also garnered Brown two American Music Awards, a Soul Train Music Award and a People's Choice Award.

In 1989, Brown contributed two songs to the soundtrack of Ghostbusters II, and he also had a cameo role in the film. The first track on that album, "On Our Own" became another top-ten single for the singer, peaking at number two. The same year, a remix compilation, Dance!...Ya Know It!, was released, and found fans in the United Kingdom. Brown embarked on a 120-day world tour to promote Don't Be Cruel in 1988, with Al B. Sure! opening for him, and New Edition also opening for him on some dates. The tour lasted into the spring of 1991, but not without Brown gaining notoriety for simulating sexual acts onstage, which got him into trouble with local law enforcement. In 1990, Brown performed "Tap into My Heart" at the 1990 MTV Awards, and was set to release the album Mystical Magic, but it was eventually shelved for reasons unknown and wasn't released. In 1990, Brown was featured on the number-one hit "She Ain't Worth It" by Glenn Medeiros, making it his second number 1 hit on the pop chart, and also collaborated with Babyface for the remix of the latter's single "Tender Lover" that same year. In 1991, Brown collaborated with New Edition member Ralph Tresvant on the latter's single "Stone Cold Gentleman", which was a top-five R&B hit.

Brown's next album Bobby was released in 1992. Despite its release during the final days of the New Jack Swing era it was success, selling more than 3 million copies, and spawning several hit singles including "Humpin' Around", "Get Away", and "Good Enough". He received his second Grammy Award for Best Male R&B Vocal Performance nomination for "Humpin' Around". He received his third American Music Award in January 1993. However, sales of Bobby did not match its predecessor.  Whitney Houston and Brown had recorded a song together, "Something in Common", which was released as a single from the Bobby album.

In 1994, dance producers K-Klass remixed "Two Can Play That Game" from the Bobby album, it would become Brown's biggest single in the UK peaking at No.3 in 1995.

Four years later, he would release his fourth solo album Forever, in 1997.  The album's only single, "Feeling Inside", was not successful.

Prior to the release of Forever, Brown had been in negotiations with rapper Tupac Shakur to sign with Shakur's new label Makaveli Records, or with the proposed label Death Row East. However, Shakur died before that could take place. Leaving MCA following Forever, Brown laid low for several years, appearing as a featured artist in 2001 on two tracks from The Benzino Project, and in 2002 he was featured in a duet with rapper Ja Rule on the song "Thug Lovin'". Brown was signed to Murder Inc. Records, but that label had already begun to dissolve, so Brown's tenure with them was brief. In 2006, Brown appeared adding vocals to Damian Marley's song "Beautiful" on Marley's album, Welcome to Jamrock.

In 2008, Brown planned to release a book titled Bobby Brown: The Truth, the Whole Truth and Nothing But, written by author Derrick Handspike. When controversial comments that Brown made about his ex-wife, Whitney Houston, were leaked to the media, he backed out of the project. Handspike released the book after Houston's death in 2012.

In 2010, Brown was featured in a duet with singer Macy Gray on the song "Real Love" on Gray's album The Sellout. About this project, Gray explained to Essence, "Actually, he came to the studio, since he doesn't live far, and knocked out his recording in two hours. We're friends, and his one-year-old son is my godson. His fiancée is one of my best friends in the whole world. I met Bobby a long time ago, but we really got to know each other through her."

On June 5, 2012, Brown released his fifth album, The Masterpiece, which debuted at number 41 on the Billboard R&B album chart.

On February 14, 2017, Brown performed at the Valentine's Day Music Festival with Keith Sweat, Avant and El DeBarge.

New Edition reunions 
Brown made his first reunited appearance with New Edition at the 1990 MTV Video Music Awards. Their performance later sparked the recording of Bell Biv DeVoe's "Word to the Mutha!" in 1991 (on which Brown, Ralph Tresvant and later NE member Johnny Gill were included). A fully-fledged reunion occurred with the 1996 release of the album, Home Again. Brown contributed lead vocals on two hit singles, "Hit Me Off" and "You Don't Have to Worry". However, a subsequent 1997 tour to support the album led to problems between Brown and the other New Edition members. Brown later admitted that he was struggling with drug addiction and alcoholism during the tour.

In 2005, at the BET 25th Anniversary Special, Brown again reunited with New Edition. In 2008, Brown, Ralph Tresvant, and Johnny Gill then formed a splinter group, Heads of State, to compete with Bell Biv DeVoe. At the 2009 BET Awards, following the death of the group's idol Michael Jackson, all six of the New Edition members again reunited to perform a medley of Jackson 5 hits in honor of Jackson. This sparked rumors of another full-fledged New Edition reunion, which was confirmed the following year.

Brown and New Edition continue to perform together, including The Culture Tour, which began in early 2022.

Acting and television career 
Brown made his acting debut with a cameo appearance in the 1989 film, Ghostbusters II, playing the Mayor's doorman. The following year, he appeared in the HBO kids show, Mother Goose Rock 'n' Rhyme playing all three characters of Three Blind Mice. In 1995, he made another guest appearance in the film, Panther, and had a major role in the Martin Lawrence film, A Thin Line Between Love and Hate. Brown made other guest appearances in the films Two Can Play That Game, Gang of Roses, Nora's Hair Salon and Go for Broke.

In 2005, Brown was in negotiations with the Bravo television network for a reality series entitled Being Bobby Brown. Bravo, however, was not ready to commit to the deal unless Brown's superstar wife Whitney Houston agreed to be part of the cast, which she did. The show then received the greenlight from Bravo and was a massive success in the ratings, with Houston proving so popular on the series that she received as much screen time as the show's name-sake. The series showed Brown and Houston not always in their best moments. The Hollywood Reporter said that the show was "undoubtedly the most disgusting and execrable series ever to ooze its way onto television". Despite the perceived train-wreck nature of the show, it continued Houston's unbroken string of hit motion pictures and television projects, and it gave Bravo its highest ratings ever of any of its ongoing series. The show lasted one season and ended in 2006 after Houston stated she would not appear in season two and Bravo and Brown could not settle on a new deal.

In June 2007, Brown took part in the ITV television series 24 Hours With..., a chat show format as celebrity and interviewer spend an intense 24 hours locked in a room together. The show's host, Jamie Campbell, asked Brown questions about his career and private life, and infamously joked about making "sexual moves" towards the singer. Brown was furious and threatened to beat Campbell up live on air. Brown's later tenures in reality shows included appearances on Real Husbands of Hollywood,  Celebrity Fit Club and Gone Country.

In 2021, Brown competed in season five of The Masked Singer as the wild card contestant "Crab". At one point after performing Rick James's song "Give It to Me Baby", Brown had to be briefly taken to his dressing room when he became overheated and short of breath in his costume. He was later eliminated on Week 7 alongside Tamera Mowry as "Seashell".

In May 2022, Biography: Bobby Brown and Bobby Brown: Every Little Step began airing on A&E. Brown is an executive-producer of both the documentary-style and reality television series about his life.

Personal life 
In 1995, Brown was with Steven Sealy when Sealy was targeted in a drive-by shooting. Sealy, Brown's sister's boyfriend, was killed and Brown was unharmed. The shooter, John Tibbs, took a plea agreement in 2001.

Brown's parents, Carole and Herbert Brown, died within a year of each other. Carole in 2011 and Herbert "Pops" in January 2012, a month before Bobby's former wife Whitney Houston's death.

Marriages 
Brown first met Whitney Houston at the Soul Train Music Awards in 1989. They began a close friendship after Houston invited Brown to her birthday party. Their friendship developed into a romance. In 1991, Brown proposed marriage to Houston and the couple married at Houston's estate on July 18, 1992. Their daughter Bobbi Kristina Brown was born in 1993. Houston and Brown later collaborated on the hit single "Something in Common", which included their daughter at the end of the music video.

Throughout their marriage, there were rumors of infidelity on Brown's part, drug use, and one instance where Brown was charged with hitting Houston. Their personal issues became fodder for talk shows and sketch comedy shows. Some sketch comedy shows portrayed Brown as a has-been who is jealous of his wife's celebrity status. In 2003, Brown was charged with battery after an altercation with Houston.

In 2005, the couple participated in the reality show Being Bobby Brown, which gave a picture of their lives behind the scenes. In September 2006, Houston filed for legal separation and later divorce. Their divorce was finalized on April 24, 2007, with Houston receiving custody of their 14-year-old daughter. In a September 2009 interview with Oprah Winfrey, Houston admitted to sometimes using drugs with Brown, stating that Brown had "laced marijuana with cocaine". Houston also told Winfrey that Brown had been abusive during their marriage and even spat on her on one occasion while drunk.

Following the death of Houston on February 11, 2012, six days after his 43rd birthday, Brown struggled to perform at a New Edition show, shouting "I love you, Whitney" in tears. Brown then excused himself from the stage and New Edition finished the remainder of the show. Brown appeared at Houston's memorial service in New Jersey but was asked to leave by the family's security. In an interview given to The Today Show in May 2012, Brown said security was the reason he and his family left the service; Brown stated that he loved Houston's family and told Matt Lauer that he had spent "14 beautiful years" with Houston as his wife. Along with Clive Davis, Ray J, and others, Brown has been accused of contributing to the singer's death, which he denies.

In 2009, Brown had a son named Cassius with his partner of two years, manager Alicia Etheredge. Brown and Etheredge became engaged in May 2010, when Brown proposed during a performance at the Funk Fest in Jacksonville, Florida. The couple married on June 18, 2012, in Hawaii and have since had two daughters.

Children 
Brown has fathered seven children. His eldest, Landon, was born on June 22, 1986 to Melika Williams. He has two children with Kim Ward, whom he met around 1980; daughter La'Princia (born 1989) and son Bobby Brown, Jr. (1991–2020). His and Ward's on-and-off 11-year relationship ended in 1991. At two months pregnant, Ward found out Brown was engaged to Whitney Houston. Houston suffered miscarriages in 1992, 1995, and 1996. His only child with Houston, Bobbi Kristina Brown, was born on March 4, 1993. Brown has three children with Alicia Etheredge: a son born in 2009, and daughters born in 2015 and 2016.

In January 2015, Brown's daughter Bobbi Kristina was found unconscious in her bathtub at her residence in Roswell, Georgia. The 21-year-old was rushed to North Fulton Hospital where she was placed on a ventilator in a medically induced coma to stop the swelling of her brain. It was reported her brain activity was "low". Brown rushed to his daughter's side and released a statement to the press requesting them to respect the family's privacy. She was later transferred to Emory University Hospital. After doctors concluded that significant brain function was unlikely to occur, Bobbi Kristina was removed from the ventilator and put in the care of Hospice in Duluth, Georgia. She died there on July 26, 2015 at age 22.

On November 18, 2020, Brown's son Bobby Jr., age 28, was found dead in his home.

Health and drug use 
As a child, Brown was diagnosed with ADD and later with bipolar disorder at age 32. Brown said that his drug of choice was marijuana and that he had developed alcoholism at an early age. Brown claimed Houston introduced him to cocaine shortly before their wedding in 1992. "I never used cocaine until after I met Whitney. Before then, I had experimented with other drugs, but marijuana was my drug of choice," he said. Throughout the 1990s, his drug addiction worsened and at one point he was cooking cocaine and using heroin.

According to former gang member David Collins, Brown was kidnapped by New York street gang the Preacher Crew over a $25,000 drug debt in 1993. Houston paid a $400,000 ransom to the gang who threatened to kill Brown. The incident was never reported to authorities.

Legal issues 
Since 1989, Brown has been arrested multiple times for various offenses:

 In September 1990, Brown was charged with disorderly conduct for refusing to leave a restaurant after his brother Tommy was arrested.
In April 1995, Brown and two friends were charged in the beating of a nightclub patron in Orlando. Police reported that after his arrest, Brown urinated in a police patrol car and scratched four-letter words in the vinyl. The charges were dropped after the victim settled a civil lawsuit against Brown.
 In August 1995, Brown was cited for battery after police said he kicked a hotel security guard who was sent to his room to check out noise complaints.
 In January 1998, Brown was convicted in Florida of two misdemeanors: driving under the influence and causing property damage. The charges stemmed from 1996 when Brown crashed Houston's sports car into a condominium sign. He served five days in jail then was released on probation.
In June 1998, Brown was arrested on suspicion of sexual battery for allegedly slapping a woman's bottom at the Beverly Hills Hotel. The case was dropped due to insufficient evidence.
 From May to June 2000, Brown spent 26 days in jail after he was arrested by U.S. Customs agents in New Jersey following a trip from the Bahamas. The arrest stemmed from an outstanding warrant for violating probation in his 1996 drunken driving conviction. The warrant had been issued in June 1999, after Brown's probation officer reported that cocaine had been found in his urine test twice.
 In November 2002, Brown was arrested on drug and traffic charges, and later discovered he was wanted on the 1996 warrant.
 In January 2003, Brown served an eight-day sentence in the DeKalb County, Georgia jail after he pleaded guilty to a 1996 drunken driving charge and a count of speeding.
In August 2003, Brown was sentenced to 14 days in jail for probation violations stemming from a 1996 drunken driving charge. His sentence was followed by 60 days of house arrest.
 In December 2003, Brown was charged with battery for striking his wife Whitney Houston and threatening to "beat her ass." Police reported that Houston had visible injuries to her face.
 In March 2004, Brown was sentenced to 90 days in jail for owing $63,000 in back child support to Kim Ward. After spending one night in jail, he was released when he paid off the debt.
In June 2004, Brown received a suspended 90-day prison sentence for missing three consecutive child support payments. The sentence was suspended after six days when Brown made the back payments.
In February 2007, Brown was sentenced to 30 days in jail for unpaid child support in the amount of $20,000 to Kim Ward. He was released after 3 days when a radio station paid his fees.
 In April 2012, Brown was arrested for drunken driving. He spent time in a "confidential rehabilitation center" as part of his plea deal.
 In October 2012, Brown was arrested for drunken driving. He was ordered to attend at least three Alcoholics Anonymous sessions each week until he reported to the Los Angeles County jail. In February 2013, Brown was sentenced to 55 days in jail and four years of summary probation following his second drunken driving conviction in a year. He was released after serving nine hours and put on electronic monitoring by Los Angeles County Probation.

In popular culture 
Brown popularized the Roger Rabbit dance (aka the "backwards" running man), as performed in the music video for his song "Every Little Step" (1989), along with the Gumby-style hi-top fade. Brown has claimed that he taught Michael Jackson how to do the moonwalk.

Brown was spoofed by Aries Spears on MADtv, with Whitney Houston portrayed by Debra Wilson. He was also spoofed by Tracy Morgan and Finesse Mitchell on Saturday Night Live. Brown was portrayed by Arlen Escarpeta in the television film Whitney, by Woody McClain in the 2017 miniseries The New Edition Story and in the 2018 miniseries about his life, The Bobby Brown Story. Brown is also portrayed by Ashton Sanders in the Whitney Houston biopic, Whitney Houston: I Wanna Dance with Somebody, that was released Christmas 2022.

In 2022, Brown also claimed he started wearing the "diaper pants" that MC Hammer altered and made famous, on his A&E show Bobby Brown: Every Little Step. However, Brown wore a less sagging variation during some concerts and in music videos, such as "My Prerogative" (1988) and "Every Little Step" (1989).

Discography

Studio albums 
King of Stage (1986)
Don't Be Cruel (1988)
Bobby (1992)
Forever (1997)
The Masterpiece (2012)

With New Edition 
Candy Girl (1983)
New Edition (1984)
All for Love (1985)
Home Again (1996)

Tours 
Heartbreak Tour (with Al B. Sure! and New Edition) (1988)
Don't Be Cruel Tour (1988–1991)
Humpin' Around the World Tour (1992–1993)
New Edition Reunion Tour (1996)
Forever Tour (1997–1998)
Heads of State Tour (2008–2014)
RBRM Tour (2018)
The Culture Tour (2022)
The Legacy Tour (2023)

Filmography

References

External links 
 
 
 NEW Bobby Brown HD interview April 2010

1969 births
Living people
20th-century American singers
21st-century American singers
African-American Christians
African-American male dancers
African-American male singers
African-American songwriters
American child singers
American contemporary R&B singers
American dance musicians
American hip hop singers
American male dancers
American male pop singers
American male singers
American male songwriters
American people convicted of drug offenses
American prisoners and detainees
American soul singers
Child pop musicians
Grammy Award winners
Musicians from Atlanta
Musicians from Boston
MCA Records artists
New Edition members
New jack swing musicians
Participants in American reality television series
People charged with battery
People with bipolar disorder
Singers from Massachusetts
Songwriters from Massachusetts